Ellenwood is an unincorporated community in Clayton, Henry, Rockdale and DeKalb counties in the U.S. state of Georgia. The community is a southeast suburb of Atlanta and is located along Interstate 675 and Georgia State Route 42.  With a population of 46,967 and ten constituent neighborhoods, Ellenwood is the 19th largest community in Georgia.

Ellenwood has a post office with ZIP code 30294.

Government and infrastructure
The Atlanta Federal Records Center of the National Archives is in Ellenwood.

Transit systems
MARTA serves the suburb.

Notable people
Justin Shaffer (born 1998), NFL player

References

Populated places in Clayton County, Georgia
Populated places in DeKalb County, Georgia
Populated places in Henry County, Georgia
Unincorporated communities in Georgia (U.S. state)